Terrace Lake is a descriptive name for a small, elongate lake which lies in a valley with moraine from the Barne Glacier, about 0.5 nautical miles (0.9 km) east of Cape Barne on Ross Island. The name appears on the maps of the British Antarctic Expedition (1910–13), but may have been applied earlier by the British Antarctic Expedition (1907–09).

References

Lakes of Ross Island